Erwin Rommel was a German World War II field marshal.

Rommel may also refer to:
Rommel (surname)
Rómmel, a surname
Rommel (film), a German television film
German destroyer Rommel (D187), a West German guided missile destroyer
Jurgen Vsych or Rommel, film director

People with the given name
Rommel Adducul (born 1976), Filipino basketball player
Rommel Fernández (1966-1993), first Panamanian footballer to play in Europe
Rommel Pacheco (born 1986), Mexican diver